Kathryn Davis may refer to:

Kathryn Davis (writer) (born 1946), American novelist
Kathryn C. Davis (born 1978), American judge
Kathryn Wasserman Davis (1907–2013), American philanthropist